Phillipsville is a small community in Houghton County, Michigan located immediately north of Kearsarge.

The Last Place on Earth antique store is in the community. 
U.S. Highway 41 runs through the town.

References

External links
Map at Brainygeography.com

Geography of Houghton County, Michigan